Pilica is a village in the municipality of Bajina Bašta, Serbia. According to the 2002 census, the village has a population of  653 people.

References

Populated places in Zlatibor District